The Betty White Show refers to several shows hosted by Betty White:

The Betty White Show (1952 TV series), which aired on NBC in 1954, having originated locally two years prior 
The Betty White Show (1977 TV series), which aired on CBS in 1977 and 1978